Antoine Bonifaci (4 September 1931 – 29 December 2021) was a French professional footballer who played in France with Nice and Stade Français, and in Italy with Inter Milan, Bologna, Torino and Vicenza. He played for the France national team from 1951 to 1953.
In 1952, he was transferred from Nice to Inter Milan for a fee of around 30 million francs.

The football stadium of Villefranche-sur-Mer bears his name. 

Bonifaci died in Villefranche-sur-Mer on 29 December 2021, at the age of 90.

References

External links
 Player profile at Fédération Française de Football 

1931 births
2021 deaths
French footballers
Association football midfielders
France international footballers
OGC Nice players
Inter Milan players
Bologna F.C. 1909 players
Torino F.C. players
L.R. Vicenza players
Stade Français (association football) players
Ligue 1 players
Serie A players
Serie B players
French expatriate footballers
French expatriate sportspeople in Italy
Expatriate footballers in Italy
Footballers from Val-d'Oise
People from Bezons